Institute of Mental Health, Amritsar also known as Dr. Vidyasagar Government Mental Hospital is public mental health institution and hospital run by Government of Punjab, located at circular road, Amritsar, Punjab. It serves the mental health patients from Punjab, Haryana, Himachal Pradesh  and other neighboring states. Dr Savinder Singh is current in-charge of the Dr. Vidya Sagar Institute of Mental Health.

History
Established originally at Lahore in 1900, shifted at Amritsar in 1947 after Partition of Punjab when non-Muslim patients were transferred here. Punjab police has duty of shifting mentally ill patients roaming on roads to the institute. In 2008, 100 acres of lawns land of hospital was transferred to Taj Swarna hotel in Trilium Mall.

Shaheed Madan Lal Dhingra Memorial School of Nursing 
School of Nursing at Dr. Vidyasagar Government Mental Hospital provides General Nursing and Midwifery (GNM) and BSc Nursing courses with hostel facilities.

Notable people
Dr. Vidya Sagar, in 1957, improved the hospital with some changes.
Dr. B L Goel, Hospital Director in early 2000s

See also
Institute of Mental Health and Hospital, Agra
Vidyasagar Institute of Mental Health and Neuro Sciences

References

External links
 Official website

Psychiatric hospitals in India
Hospitals in Punjab, India
Hospitals established in 1900
1900 establishments in India